is a Japanese gymnast, world champion and Olympic champion.

Olympics
Kashima won a gold medal in the team all-around and a bronze medal in pommel-horse at the 2004 Summer Olympics in Athens.  At the 2008 Summer Olympics in Beijing, he won a silver medal in the team all-around.

World championships
Kashima won a bronze medal in pommel horse at the 2002 World Artistic Gymnastics Championships in Debrecen. At the 2003 World Artistic Gymnastics Championships in Anaheim he won a gold medal in high bar, a gold medal in pommel horse, and a bronze medal with Japan in the team final. He won a bronze medal in pommel horse at the 2005 World Artistic Gymnastics Championships in Melbourne.

References

External links
 

1980 births
Living people
Japanese male artistic gymnasts
Gymnasts at the 2004 Summer Olympics
Gymnasts at the 2008 Summer Olympics
Olympic gymnasts of Japan
Olympic gold medalists for Japan
Olympic silver medalists for Japan
Olympic bronze medalists for Japan
Sportspeople from Osaka
Medalists at the World Artistic Gymnastics Championships
Olympic medalists in gymnastics
Medalists at the 2008 Summer Olympics
Medalists at the 2004 Summer Olympics
Asian Games medalists in gymnastics
Gymnasts at the 2002 Asian Games
Recipients of the Medal with Purple Ribbon
Asian Games bronze medalists for Japan
Medalists at the 2002 Asian Games
Universiade medalists in gymnastics
Universiade gold medalists for Japan
Universiade bronze medalists for Japan
Medalists at the 2005 Summer Universiade
20th-century Japanese people
21st-century Japanese people